Magdeburg was one of the three Regierungsbezirke of Saxony-Anhalt, Germany, located in the north of the country.

History
The region was formed in 1815 as a subdivision of the Kingdom of Prussia's Province of Saxony, becoming part of Saxony-Anhalt after World War II. The Regierungsbezirk was disbanded on January 1, 2004. Its functions were taken over by the Landesverwaltungsamt, which has three offices at the former seats of the Bezirksregierungen.

Subdivision

Kreise(districts)
Altmarkkreis Salzwedel
Aschersleben-Staßfurt
Bördekreis
Halberstadt
Jerichower Land
Ohrekreis
Quedlinburg
Schönebeck
Stendal
Wernigerode

''Kreisfreie Städte''(district-free towns)
Magdeburg

See also
Bezirk Magdeburg

Former states and territories of Saxony-Anhalt
Government regions of Prussia
States and territories established in 1815
States and territories disestablished in 2004
1815 establishments in Prussia
2004 disestablishments in Germany
Region
Former government regions of Germany